Street Racer is a racing video game developed for the Atari Video Computer System, later known as the Atari 2600. It was programmed by Larry Kaplan and released by Atari, Inc. in September 1977 as one of the nine Atari VCS launch titles.<ref
name="AtariAgeLaunch"/> The game was also published by Sears for their Tele-Games product line as Speedway II.

Gameplay 

Street Racer was one of the two launch titles programmed by Kaplan; Air-Sea Battle was the other. Street Racer offered 27 game variations, grouped into the following sub-games:
 1–6: Street racer
 7–12: Slalom
 13–16: Dodgem
 17–20: Jet shooter
 21–24: Number cruncher
 25–27: Scoop ball

Each of the sub-games has roughly the same gameplay: the player controls a vehicle that must avoid or collect certain objects as they scroll down the screen. Between one and four players can compete simultaneously by using the paddle controllers, which allow the vehicle to move left and right along the bottom of the screen. If a one-player game is selected, the player competes with a static computer opponent that allows objects to collide with it or pass by.

Development
As one of the earliest games written for the platform, Street Racer suffered from unattractive, blocky graphics. According to Kaplan himself, later racing games released for the Atari, such as Activision's 1982 games Barnstorming and Grand Prix, were able to offer improved graphics and gameplay.
In a 2007 interview with Digital Press, Kaplan was asked what he would change about any of the games he had written:

Kaplan went on to become one of the founders of Activision where he developed Kaboom!, one of the 10 top-selling games for the Atari 2600.

Reception 
Street Racer was reviewed in Video magazine as part of a general review of the Atari VCS where it was given a review score of 5.5 out of 10. The game did not age well and modern critics have given it poor reviews as well. Gamasutra have described the "Number cruncher" sub-game as a highlight of the game.

References

External links 
 

1977 video games
Atari 2600 games
Atari games
North America-exclusive video games
Multiplayer and single-player video games
Top-down racing video games
Video games developed in the United States